Bullington is a village and civil parish in the West Lindsey district of Lincolnshire, England. According to the 2001 Census the village had a population of 36. At  the 2011 census the population remained less than 100 and is included in the civil parish of Goltho.

Bullington Hall is a Grade II listed farmhouse within the village, originating in the 17th century with later rebuilding and additions.

Bullington Priory is located in the south of the parish.

References

External links

Villages in Lincolnshire
Civil parishes in Lincolnshire
West Lindsey District